Shahid Rajai Garrison ( – Pādegān-e Shahīd Rajā’ī) is a village and military installation in Baladarband Rural District, in the Central District of Kermanshah County, Kermanshah Province, Iran. At the 2006 census, its population was 359, in 97 families.

References 

Populated places in Kermanshah County
Military installations of Iran
Recruit training centres of Iranian Police